Samira Samii (born 1977) is a sports agent and columnist for the German football magazine Rund. She is the only female agent working in the German Bundesliga.

Samii was born in Tehran and raised in France and Canada. Her father, Hossein Samii, is a noted eye surgeon and her mother a member of a Persian noble family. She moved to Munich when she was 19 to study international tourism management and later also acquired a degree in sports management in Canada. In addition to her career as a sports agent for multiple players in the German Bundesliga, she also works as an ambassador for German international Per Mertesacker's charitable foundation which focuses on helping socially disadvantaged children  through sports activities. In 2012, she received the "Woman of the Year" award from the Trialog Institute, and has also served on the jury for "Miss Franken Classic" and other beauty contests.

Samii married Mehdi Mahdavikia at a ceremony in Iran in December 2005. They separated and later divorced after she learned in April 2006 that he was still married to his first wife.

References

External links 
 

1977 births
Living people
German sports agents
German women journalists
21st-century German businesswomen
21st-century German businesspeople
Women sports agents
People from Tehran
German people of Iranian descent